Velvet Hammer Music and Management Group is a management company, artist development, and record label located in West Hollywood, California in the United States. Current client roster includes AFI, Alice in Chains, Avenged Sevenfold, Blaqk Audio, Deftones, Jerry Cantrell, Jonathan Davis, Korn, Scars on Broadway, System Of A Down.

History
The company was founded in 1997 by David "Beno" Benveniste, expanding out of Benveniste's independent music management practice. Beno was born and raised in Beverly Hills, California, and graduated from the University of Southern California.  He began a career in the music industry after developing the band System Of A Down.  Through his creation of the marketing company Streetwise Concepts & Culture, a fan volunteer network that assembled over the Internet for grassroots promotion, Beno tapped into the power of youth marketing to promote the group. Within three years, he was able to build an army of over 30,000 kids through the platform to distribute promotional items to their friends on behalf of bands he managed through “hand-to-hand” promotion.

In 2004, Benveniste signed a joint venture deal to move the Velvet Hammer music label from Atlantic Records to Columbia Records over a several-year period. Under the terms of the deal, Velvet Hammer clients Taproot, Poison the Well and Gratitude would continue to record with Atlantic, while Benveniste signed OneRepublic to Columbia. Afterwards, Sony/ATV and Velvet Hammer Music collaborated to publish the ASCAP award winning song "Apologize" by OneRepublic. Benveniste already had a long established relationship with Columbia and its parent, Sony, having first brought System of a Down to Columbia in 1996 and at one time managing Mudvayne, signed to Sony's Epic Records. In 2008, Velvet Hammer signed a three-year deal with Sony subsidiary RED Distribution, which handled the marketing and publicity for Taproot's album Our Long Road Home.

In 1999, Velvet Hammer was drawn into a feud with Fred Durst of Limp Bizkit when Taproot chose to sign with Velvet Hammer Management rather than Interscope.

References

External links
Velvet Hammer Official Site

Talent and literary agencies
Companies based in Los Angeles County, California
Mass media companies established in 1997